An international nonproprietary name (INN) is an official generic and nonproprietary name given to a pharmaceutical drug or an active ingredient. INNs are intended to make communication more precise by providing a unique standard name for each active ingredient, to avoid prescribing errors. The INN system has been coordinated by the World Health Organization (WHO) since 1953.

Having unambiguous standard names for each drug (standardization of drug nomenclature) is important because a drug may be sold by many different brand names, or a branded medication may contain more than one drug. For example, the branded medications Celexa, Celapram and Citrol all contain the same active ingredient: citalopram; and the antibiotic widely known by the brand name Bactrim contains two active ingredients: trimethoprim and sulfamethoxazole. This combination of two antibiotic agents in one tablet has been available as a generic for decades, but the brand names Bactrim and Septra are still in common use.

Each drug's INN is unique but may contain a word stem that is shared with other drugs of the same class; for example, the beta blocker drugs propranolol and atenolol share the -olol suffix, and the benzodiazepine drugs lorazepam and diazepam share the -azepam suffix.

An established INN is known as a recommended INN (rINN), while a name that is still being considered is called a proposed INN (pINN).

Name stems
Drugs from the same therapeutic or chemical class are usually given names with the same stem. Stems are mostly placed word-finally, but in some cases word-initial stems are used. They are collected in a publication informally known as the Stem Book.

Examples are:
 -anib for angiogenesis inhibitors (e.g. pazopanib)
 -anserin for serotonin receptor antagonists, especially 5-HT2 antagonists (e.g. ritanserin and mianserin)
 -ant for various receptors antagonists (e.g. aticaprant and rimonabant)
 -arit for antiarthritic agents (e.g. lobenzarit)
 -ase for enzymes (e.g. alteplase)
 -azepam or -azolam for benzodiazepines (e.g. diazepam and alprazolam)
 -caine for local anaesthetics (e.g. procaine or cocaine)
 -cain- for class I antiarrhythmics (e.g. procainamide)
 -coxib for COX-2 inhibitors, a type of anti-inflammatory drugs (e.g. celecoxib)
 -mab for monoclonal antibodies (e.g. infliximab); see Nomenclature of monoclonal antibodies
 for cannabinoid receptor agonists (e.g. cannabidiol, dronabinol)
 for cannabinoid receptor antagonists 
  for antiretroviral protease inhibitors (e.g. darunavir)
 -olol for beta blockers (e.g. atenolol)
 -pril for ACE inhibitors (e.g. captopril)
 -sartan for angiotensin II receptor antagonists (e.g. losartan)
 -tinib for tyrosine kinase inhibitors (e.g. imatinib)
 -vastatin for HMG-CoA reductase inhibitors, a group of cholesterol-lowering agents (e.g. simvastatin)
 -vir for antivirals (e.g. aciclovir or ritonavir)
 arte- for artemisinin antimalarials (e.g. artemether)
 cef- for cephalosporins (e.g. cefalexin)
 io- for iodine-containing radiopharmaceuticals (e.g. iobenguane)
 -vec for gene therapy vectors (e.g. alipogene tiparvovec)
 -meran for messenger RNA products (e.g. tozinameran)

Linguistic discussion

Stems and roots
The term stem is not used consistently in linguistics. It has been defined as a form to which affixes (of any type) can be attached. Under a different and apparently more common view, this is the definition of a root, while a stem consists of the root plus optional derivational affixes, meaning that it is the part of a word to which inflectional affixes are added. INN stems employ the first definition, while under the more common alternative they would be described as roots.

Translingual communication
Pharmacology and pharmacotherapy (like health care generally) are universally relevant around the world, making translingual communication about them an important goal. An interlingual perspective is thus useful in drug nomenclature. The WHO issues INNs in English, Latin, French, Russian, Spanish, Arabic, and Chinese. A drug's INNs are often cognates across most or all of the languages, but they also allow small inflectional, diacritic, and transliterational differences that are usually transparent and trivial for nonspeakers (as is true of most international scientific vocabulary). For example, although paracetamolum (la) has an inflectional difference from paracetamol (en), and although paracétamol (fr) has a diacritic difference, the differences are trivial; users can easily recognize the "same word" (although Americans will likely not recognize the word paracetamol in the first place, because that medicine is known as "acetaminophen" in the United States, even among most healthcare professionals, illustrating that the INN system is not perfect in its functioning). And although парацетамол (ru) and paracetamol (en) have a transliterational difference, they sound similar, and for Russian speakers who can recognize Latin script or English speakers who can recognize Cyrillic script, they look similar; users can recognize the "same word". Thus, INNs make medicines bought anywhere in the world as easily identifiable as possible to people who do not speak that language. Notably, the "same word" principle allows health professionals and patients who do not speak the same language to communicate to some degree and to avoid potentially life-threatening confusions from drug interactions.

Spelling regularization
A number of spelling changes are made to British Approved Names and other older nonproprietary names with an eye toward interlingual standardization of pronunciation across major languages. Thus a predictable spelling system, approximating phonemic orthography, is used, as follows:

 ae or oe is replaced by e (e.g. estradiol vs. oestradiol)
 ph is replaced by f (e.g. amfetamine vs. amphetamine) 
 th is replaced by t (e.g. metamfetamine vs. methamphetamine) 
 y is replaced by i (e.g. aciclovir vs. acyclovir)
 h and k are avoided where possible

Names for radicals and groups (salts, esters, and so on)
Many drugs are supplied as salts, with a cation and an anion. The way the INN system handles these is explained by the WHO at its "Guidance on INN" webpage. For example, amfetamine and oxacillin are INNs, whereas various salts of these compounds – e.g., amfetamine sulfate and oxacillin sodium – are modified INNs (INNM).

Comparison of naming standards
Several countries had created their own nonproprietary naming system before the INN was created, and in many cases, the names created under the old systems continue to be used in those countries. As one example, in English the INN name for a common painkiller is paracetamol; the table below gives the alternative names for this in different systems:

See also 
 Generic drug

References

Further reading

External links 
 
 
 

Pharmacology
Names
1953 establishments
World Health Organization